Mrs. Wagner's Pies were single-serving pies sold in waxed paper, produced by the Wagner Baking Company, originally located in Ocean Grove, New Jersey, and later in Brooklyn, New York. 

In September 1940, The Newark News described Mrs. Wagner's Pies as the "largest pie bakery in the country, with its home plant in Newark and five branches as far west as Chicago." Its president at the time was F.W. Birkenhauer. 

Various sources say the company ceased operations in July 1966 and July 11, 1969.

In popular culture
The pies are mentioned in "America," a 1968 song by Simon and Garfunkel.

References

External links
Prominent Families of New Jersey, 2000
Video history of Mrs. Wagner's Pie, 2018
Image of Mrs. Wagner's Pie Truck, 1936
Polo Grounds advertisements including one for Wagner Pies

Brand name desserts
Brand name pies